Frashër is a village and a former municipality in the Gjirokastër County, southern Albania. At the 2015 local government reform it became a subdivision of the municipality Përmet. The population at the 2011 census was 387. The municipal unit consists of the villages Frashër, Zavalan, Ogren-Kostrec, Gostivisht, Miçan, Vërçisht, Kreshovë and Soropull.

Frashër is widely regarded as the 'Mecca' of Albania and is known for the disproportionate number of prominent intellectuals it has produced - especially in the 19th and early 20th centuries.

Name
The name of the settlement means "ash-tree" in Albanian. The word frashër (Gheg Albanian: frashën) derives from the Proto-Albanian rendering of Latin fraxinus. The settlement represents an inhabited centre that was founded after the Roman period of the Albanian language. It is said that the Frashër area has been covered with ash forests, which disappeared over time.

History
The first documented attestation of Frashëri probably comes in the form of an Albanian merchant from Frashër who had traveled to Thessaloniki in 1330.

The Frashër area in the Middle Ages was the source of several waves of migrations of Aromanians throughout the southern and central Balkans.

In 1432 the village was documented as Fracili in the Ottoman defter of the sanjak of Korçë-Përmet. The defter documented six households in Frashër at the time. The next defter to document Frashër is that of 1504. The village had 41 households, 40 of whom were Christian. The heads of households from which the major vëllazëri (brotherhoods) of Frashër would form in the 17th century include Dedë Duka, Dukë Kryeziu, Uk Deda, Gjon Deda, Martin Bardhi, Deskë Gjini, Dedë Gjini, Kozma Shurbi, Kolë Shurbi, Bendo Shurbi, Gjon Gjoni, Llazër Gjoni and others.

In June 1880 the Second Assembly of Frashër was organised by the League of Prizren.

Ottoman Albanian spahis and landowners from nineteenth century Frashër owned estate properties (chiftlik) in parts of the Balkans and in particular the Thessalian plain, until its loss to Greece in 1881 leading to local economic decline and increasing reliance on agriculture.
In 1914 the Tekke of Frashër, a 133 year-old Bektashi shrine and a center of Albanian Nationalism in the area, was destroyed by the Greek rebels of Georgios Christakis-Zografos, but was reconstructed with the contribution of Albanian-Americans in 1923.

Notable people

Dalip Frashëri, 19th-century poet
Shahin Frashëri, 19th-century poet
Abdyl Frashëri, Albanian politician and national hero
Naim Frashëri, Albanian national poet and national hero
Sami Frashëri, Albanian writer and national hero
Mid'hat Frashëri, Albanian politician, diplomat and intellectual
Mihal Zallari, Chairman of the assembly of Albania, historian and journalist
Fehim Zavalani, Albanian journalist
Mehdi Frashëri, Prime Minister of Albania

References

Bibliography

Former municipalities in Gjirokastër County
Aromanian settlements in Albania
Administrative units of Përmet
Villages in Gjirokastër County

sq:Frashëri (Përmet)